Heinz Fenchel (1906–1988) was a German art director, who designed the sets for a number of films in Weimar Germany and Czechoslovakia. He worked on several films with the director Pál Fejös. The Jewish Fenchel later emigrated to Israel where he worked as an architect.

Selected filmography
 Ship in Distress (1929)
 The Model from Montparnasse (1929)
 Phantoms of Happiness (1929)
 The Black Forest Girl (1929)
 The Convict from Istanbul (1929)
 Troika (1930)
 The Squeaker (1931)
 The Forester's Daughter (1931)
 Mamsell Nitouche (1932)
 Kiki (1932)
 The Ringer (1932)
 Ways to a Good Marriage (1933)
 The Golden Smile (1935)

References

Bibliography
 Elisabeth Büttner. Paul Fejos. Verlag Filmarchiv Austria, 2004.

External links

1906 births
1988 deaths
German art directors
20th-century German architects
Israeli architects
20th-century German Jews
German emigrants to Israel
Artists from Berlin
Architects from Berlin